In epidemiology and biostatistics, the experimental event rate (EER) is a measure of how often a particular statistical event (such as response to a drug, adverse event or death) occurs within the experimental group (non-control group) of an experiment.

This value is very useful in determining the therapeutic benefit or risk to patients in experimental groups, in comparison to patients in placebo or traditionally treated control groups.

Three statistical terms rely on EER for their calculation: absolute risk reduction, relative risk reduction and number needed to treat.

Control event rate
The  control event rate (CER) is identical to the experimental event rate except that is measured within the scientific control group of an experiment.

Worked example 
In a trial of hypothetical drug "X" where we are measuring event "Z", we have two groups. Our control group (25 people) is given a placebo, and the experimental group (25 people) is given drug "X".

Event "Z" in control group : 4 in 25 people
Control event rate : 4/25

Event "Z" in experimental group : 12 in 25 people
Experimental event rate : 12/25

Another worked example is as follows:

See also 
 Absolute risk reduction
 Relative risk reduction
 Number needed to treat

References 

Biostatistics
Epidemiology
Medical statistics
Statistical ratios